Todd Woodbridge and Mark Woodforde were the defending champions but lost in the quarterfinals to Goran Ivanišević and Diego Nargiso.

John Fitzgerald and Anders Järryd won in the final 6–4, 7–6 against Ivanišević and Nargiso.

Seeds
The top four seeded teams received byes into the second round.

Draw

Finals

Top half

Bottom half

External links
 1992 Stella Artois Championships Doubles Draw

Doubles